Crashing is an American comedy-drama television series created by Pete Holmes and executive produced by Holmes and occasional series director Judd Apatow. The first season aired on the HBO network in the United States from February 19 to April 9, 2017. It ran for a total of three seasons. The semi-autobiographical show revolves around a fictional version of Holmes, a comedian who pursues a career in stand-up comedy after his wife cheats on him, leaving him homeless. Several comedians play themselves in recurring roles, including Artie Lange and T. J. Miller, while others have guest appearances.

After Holmes successfully pitched the idea of the show to Apatow, he completed a script of its pilot episode. HBO picked it up for filming in September 2015, with Apatow as director. The success of the pilot led HBO to give the green light to the first season in January 2016. After four episodes had aired, HBO renewed the series for a second season, which premiered on January 14, 2018.

On February 21, 2018, HBO renewed the series for a third season, which premiered on January 20, 2019. On March 8, 2019, Holmes announced on Twitter that Crashing would not be picked up for a fourth season. He suggested that the series might conclude with a film adaptation.

Cast

Main
 Pete Holmes as a fictional young comedian. Pete aspired to be a youth pastor before he became a standup comedian.
 Artie Lange as himself
 Lauren Lapkus as Jessica, Pete's ex-wife
 George Basil as Leif, an art teacher

Recurring
 Dov Davidoff as Jason Webber, the owner of Pete's usual club.
 Aparna Nancherla as Anaya, a fellow comedian trying to break out
 Jermaine Fowler as Russell, a fellow comedian trying to break out
 Henry Zebrowski as Porter, a fellow comedian trying to break out
 Zach Cherry as Kevin, the manager at The Grisly Pear and later Pete's representative
 T. J. Miller as himself (Season 1)
 Audrie J. Neenan as Rita Holmes, Pete's mother (Seasons 1, 3)
 Fred Applegate as Pete's Dad (Seasons 1, 3)
 Jamie Lee as Ali Reissen, a comedian and Pete's first girlfriend after his divorce (Seasons 2–3)
 Madeline Wise as Kat (Season 3)

Guest stars
Season 1
 Episode 1: Jeff Ross, Rachel Feinstein, Gina Yashere, Keith Robinson, Dante Nero, Dan Naturman, and "Big Jay" Oakerson as Village Underground Host, Todd Montesi, Greer Barnes 
 Episode 2: Gina Gershon
 Episode 4: Hannibal Buress, Marina Franklin 
 Episode 6: Ashlie Atkinson as Schmitty, Sarah Silverman, Rachael Ray and husband John Cusimano, Ron Funches, Allan Havey, David Juskow, Steve Agee, Geno Bisconte
 Episode 7: Dave Attell, Vanessa Bayer
 Episode 8: Jim Norton

Season 2
 Episode 1: Penn Jillette, Dave Attell, Greer Barnes, Doug Benson, Gilbert Gottfried
 Episode 2: Dr. Oz, Wale
 Episode 3: Bill Burr, Joy Behar
 Episode 4: Whitney Cummings, Emma Willmann, Mo Amer
 Episode 5: The Lucas Brothers, John Mulaney, Joe Machi
 Episode 6: Robert Kelly, Wayne Federman, Jessica Kirson, Greer Barnes, Greg Fitzsimmons
 Episode 7: Melissa Villaseñor
 Episode 8: Jeff Ross, Mike Lawrence, Tony Hinchcliffe

Season 3
 Episode 1: Jaboukie Young-White
 Episode 2: Elon Gold, Modi Rosenfeld
 Episode 3: Ray Romano, Dave Attell, Dan Naturman, Mike Lawrence, Joyelle Johnson
 Episode 4: Barrett Wilbert Weed
 Episode 6: Seth Meyers, Colin Quinn, Emo Philips, Wayne Federman
 Episode 7: Eve Plumb, Amy Schumer
 Episode 8: John Mulaney, Chris Gethard, Greer Barnes

Production

Development and pilot 
In 2015, Pete Holmes finished writing a pilot episode for a new comedy series partly based on his experiences as an emerging stand-up comic. The episode was directed by Judd Apatow who also served as executive producer along with Holmes and Dave Rath, Holmes' manager. It marked Apatow's first venture as the director of a pilot. The two first met in 2012 when Apatow was a guest on Holmes's podcast, You Made It Weird. A former stand-up comic for seven years, Apatow was inspired to return to it after hearing Amy Schumer tell stories while touring and by Holmes's enthusiasm toward the profession.

The idea for Crashing originated from a sketch that Holmes and Apatow filmed for the February 24, 2014 episode of Holmes's late night talk show The Pete Holmes Show on the TBS network. In the sketch, Holmes pitches increasingly terrible ideas for a film except one, based on Holmes's own life, involving a religious man whose wife cheats on him after six years of marriage. Apatow responds: "That doesn't seem like a comedy at all. That just seems tragic and sad". 

Holmes did not see the potential of his life experiences as a premise for a show until his friend, actor Brian Sacca, suggesting adapting it as a one-person show for Holmes to play. After The Pete Holmes Show ended in June 2014, Holmes realized he "needed something new to do, so I took a quiet moment to think, what is it exactly I want to do? What's the story I want to tell?" 

After an "unproductive" meeting with executives at Comedy Central about a new sketch comedy show, he began to develop the premise of Crashing in his head. Two days later, he flew to New York City for a day to pitch it to Apatow. He used a break in Apatow's filming of Trainwreck (2015).   Apatow, who had returned to stand-up at clubs in the city, expressed  interest in the concept. He asked Holmes to write ten pages about some of his life events. Holmes e-mailed Apatow a document "filled with truly embarrassing admissions and sad things". The two worked on the pilot from then on.

In September 2015, after they pitched the pilot to several television networks, HBO executive vice president of HBO programming, Amy Gravitt, gave the green-light to have it filmed. Gravitt commented: "I think for a comedy to define itself now it must have a clear point of view tonally as it relates to the story [its creator] want to tell. Having somebody like Pete helps the tone stay intact and not get diluted in the process". She also said that having Apatow "integrally involved" with the project is "incredibly important".

Filming for the pilot began in November 2015 and featured comedian and actor Artie Lange playing a scripted version of himself. His name became the title of the episode. Lange's audition was initially for a fictional and "totally different character" who "just had two lines" in the entire episode. He agreed to the audition, nonetheless, the first of which took place with Holmes, followed by the two of them with Apatow. "I had looked at the script, and Judd encourages improvising, so I just kind of got an outline in my head of what they wanted to do". Apatow told Lange to "forget the script". He used stories from Lange's first book, Too Fat to Fish (2008), to direct the dialogue in the audition, resulting in Lange's improvising about himself, which he said "was just the easiest experience". After working the writers worked on this for a week, "the character had become Artie Lange". In an interview conducted after the first day of filming, Lange said the shoot lasted for almost fourteen hours. 

The pilot was a success, and HBO ordered a pickup to the first season in January 2016, initially for an undisclosed number of episodes and without a premiere airdate. The following month, Holmes revealed the first season includes eight episodes either written or co-written by him. Lange acknowledged he received a salary of $15,000 per episode in which he was featured in season one.

Writing
When Holmes began to prepare a script for Apatow, he saw it as a good opportunity to try and impress him with his work "instead of as an exercise", which he felt improved the script as a result. Holmes clarified that the show is "loosely based" on his life due to legal reasons, but is "inspired by my life", including the time when he contacted his friend and fellow comedian Nick Kroll after his ex-wife cheated on him as he had nowhere to stay. Holmes cites friend T. J. Miller as another source for support at the time. After Apatow went over a script, he would send it back to Holmes with notes. Holmes said Apatow had a good sense of what "was the story and what wasn't", pointing out what scenes worked and others that were not necessary. In one instance, in a scene where Holmes had two characters conversing, Apatow suggested that something should also be happening.

Holmes and Apatow discussed who should be cast; Holmes credited Apatow for his "brilliant stroke of casting" for the series, pointing out Lange, Gina Gershon and Lauren Lapkus "was all Judd". The two agreed Lange was an important cast member to kick off the series, as Lange had the ability to "grab" the audience while being a suitable contrast to Pete's naive and inexperienced character. Apatow went to note Pete "naturally falls into an emotional and funny comedic rhythm with whoever the person is whose couch he's sleeping on". In the series, the man Jess cheats on is depicted as a hippie yet Holmes explained in reality, "it was a small Italian man named Rocco". In episode two, titled "The Road", Lange revealed that Holmes' character is based on a personal assistant that Lange once hired to keep him off drugs in exchange for being the opening act. Gershon plays the girl who tried to offer Lange drugs that night. Holmes said Gershon did not have a formal audition for the role; "Judd was just like: It should be Gina".

Holmes' argument with a stripper was based on criticism he received regarding his dislike for strip clubs, which led to that idea being written into the script. Holmes pointed out the idea of Lange being the uncomfortable one at the baptism and Holmes more in his element, when in previous episodes the opposite was depicted.

Filming
Filming took place in various locations in mid-2016, including New York City, New Jersey, and Westchester, New York. To prepare himself, Holmes attended real open-mic nights at comedy venues to observe younger comedians at work. The scene with Holmes and Lange in the pizza shop was initially scripted, but Apatow abandoned it for an improvised scene with Lange giving Holmes advice for a new comedian starting in the stand-up business. Holmes picked the scene as the one that clinched the series to HBO and the overall success of the first season. For the scenes filmed at the various comedy venues, Apatow made Holmes perform material from his early stand-up career "four or five times" to the crowd of extras so they would get used to hearing it, thus giving off the impression that Pete is bombing on stage.

The first and second episodes feature scenes shot in Lange's real-life apartment in Hoboken, New Jersey. The sixth episode involves Holmes as a guest on Lange's podcast titled The Artie Quitter Podcast, recorded in his kitchen. Holmes was a guest on Lange's podcast in November 2015. On June 13, Lange detailed in a tweet that the first week of shooting had taken place. On June 19, he issued another tweet revealing the second episode had been shot, and noted filming for the first season was due to finish a week later. "The Baptism", the finale of the first season, contains scenes filmed at the Sands Point Preserve in Sands Point, New York on Long Island, on June 27.

Season two
On March 15, 2017, after four episodes had aired, Gravitt gave the green-light to a second season, citing the show's positive critical response. The number of episodes ordered at the time was unknown. As season one had an open-ended conclusion, Holmes said that Pete "learned to accept his divorce, but he's still broke". One aspect that Holmes wished to bring into the second season was the idea of success, as to him, people enjoyed the show when Pete is "floundering and when something goes right". Holmes said season two would concentrate on Pete accepting what has happened and shows the character embracing his new life.

Pete meets a new friend, Ali Reissen (portrayed by Jamie Lee), a romantic interest whose comedic advice to Holmes is based on a combination of people who gave Holmes advice in real life, including Gaffigan, Demetri Martin and Bill Burr, who introduces Pete to alternative comedy. Holmes credits Apatow in bringing back Lapkus, Basil, and Attell for season two due to their favourable reception from viewers. Writing began in April 2017 in Los Angeles, followed by filming which took place in August in New York City. Comedian and writer Greg Fitzsimmons was hired as a writer for season two, and spoke of working on the set by the director's chair for sessions that lasted for up to 14 hours in venues such as the Comedy Cellar and The Village Underground. Fitzsimmons recalled disruption in filming on the street at night from tourists and locals after they noticed a film shoot was taking place.

On March 17, 2017, news of Lange's arrest for cocaine and heroin possession was made public. Apatow maintained his support for Lange, tweeting "We would never give up on Artie or anyone struggling with addiction." On March 23, Lange claimed during an interview that he was fired from the show in the wake of the incident, but in a tweet Apatow maintained this was not the case. The following day, Lange said he is "still a Crashing employee". When asked if Lange would be on season two, Holmes said: "I would absolutely say so ... having it my way, and I know Judd loves Artie too, of course he would be in."

Lange revealed his salary of $17,500 per each season two episode featuring him.

Episodes

Season 1 (2017)

Season 2 (2018)

Season 3 (2019)

Reception
Crashing has received mostly positive reviews from critics. On Rotten Tomatoes, the first season holds an approval rating of 90%, based on 39 reviews, with an average rating of 7.30/10. The site's critical consensus reads, "The refreshingly goofy Crashing embraces a measured positivity and an overall sweetness that sets it apart from its more sardonic contemporaries." On Metacritic, the first season holds an approval rating of 73 out of 100, based on 22 critics, indicating "generally favorable reviews."

Caroline Framke gave the series four stars out of five in a review for Vox, writing: "If you're anything like me when I got the assignment to review Crashing, you might be thinking to yourself ... "do we really need another comedy about comedy?” ... But Crashing makes a solid case for itself anyway by leaning into two distinctive features that set it apart", namely Holmes' charm and that the show "is really good at telling really bad jokes," which stops it from becoming "stale."

References

External links
 
 

2010s American comedy-drama television series
2017 American television series debuts
2019 American television series endings
Cultural depictions of American men
Cultural depictions of comedians
English-language television shows
HBO original programming
Television series about comedians
Television series by Apatow Productions
Television shows filmed in New York (state)
Television shows set in New York City